HIV-2 retropepsin is an enzyme. This enzyme catalyses the following chemical reaction

 Endopeptidase for which the P1 residue is preferably hydrophobic

This enzyme belongs to the peptidase family A2.

References

External links 
 

EC 3.4.23